Retiro bus station is the main bus terminal in Buenos Aires, Argentina.  It is situated in the Retiro district, two blocks north of Retiro railway station.

Overview
The station was commissioned in 1980 by the municipal government under Mayor Osvaldo Cacciatore. Designed by Fernando Serra, Jorge Valera, and Raúl Petrucci, the station was inaugurated in 1983. Buses depart from Retiro for all parts of Argentina, and for the neighbouring countries of Uruguay, Brazil, Paraguay, Bolivia, and Chile, as well as for Lima, Peru. Buses are operated from the terminal by over 100 Argentine and foreign companies. Other services at the station include gift shops, a bar, numerous fast food concessions, a pharmacy, paramedics, a Bank of the City of Buenos Aires branch, and the Integral parcel service.

The bus station has been operated since 1993 by Teba S.A., a private company. Plans for the refurbishment of the terminal were announced in 2016.

See also 
Transportation in Argentina
Retiro railway station (Belgrano, Mitre, San Martín)
Retiro underground station (Line C, Line G, Line H)

References

External links 
  (in Spanish)

Buildings and structures in Buenos Aires
Government buildings completed in 1983
Transport infrastructure completed in 1983
Bus stations in Argentina
Transport in Buenos Aires